The discography of Japanese band Sakanaction includes six studio albums, eight singles, four video releases, and multiple digital downloads. Since their 2007 debut, all of Sakanaction's releases have been released under Victor Entertainment in Japan. Sakanaction currently have two albums certified gold by the RIAJ, Documentaly (2011) and Sakanaction (2013). Four songs by Sakanaction have been certified gold by the RIAJ for digital downloads, and their single "Good-Bye" / "Eureka" (2014) reached number two on Oricon's singles chart.

Studio albums

Compilation albums

Live albums

Soundtracks

Extended plays

Singles

Promotional singles

Other charted songs

Video albums

Music video albums

Live albums

Music videos

Notes

References 

Discographies of Japanese artists
Electronic music discographies
Rock music group discographies